The Devil's Advocate (marketed as Devil's Advocate) is a 1997 American supernatural horror film directed by Taylor Hackford, written by Jonathan Lemkin and Tony Gilroy, and starring Keanu Reeves, Al Pacino, and Charlize Theron. Based on Andrew Neiderman's 1990 novel of the same name, it is about a gifted young Florida lawyer (Reeves) invited to New York City to work for a major firm. As his wife (Theron) becomes haunted by frightening visions, the lawyer slowly begins to realize the owner of the firm (Pacino) is not what he appears to be, and is in fact the Devil.

Pacino's character, Satan, takes the guise of a human lawyer named after the author of Paradise Lost, John Milton. The story and direction contain allusions to Milton's epic, Dante Alighieri's Inferno, and the legend of Faust. An adaptation of Neiderman's novel went into a development hell during the 1990s, with Hackford gaining control of the production. Filming took place around New York City and Florida.

The Devil's Advocate received mixed reviews, with critics crediting it for entertainment value and Pacino's performance. It grossed over $153 million in the box office and won the Saturn Award for Best Horror Film. It also became the subject of the copyright lawsuit Hart v. Warner Bros., Inc. for its visual art.

Plot
Kevin Lomax is a Gainesville, Florida defense attorney who has never lost a case. While defending schoolteacher Lloyd Gettys against a charge of child molestation, he realizes his client is guilty. Despite this, Kevin destroys the victim's credibility, securing a "not guilty" verdict.

A New York City law firm asks Kevin to assist a jury selection. After the jury delivers a not guilty verdict, the head of the firm, John Milton, offers Kevin a high-paying job. Kevin accepts, and he and his wife Mary Ann move to Manhattan. He is soon spending most of his time at work, leaving Mary Ann feeling isolated. Kevin's fundamentalist mother Alice, suggests they both return home after an unsettling conversation with Milton, but Kevin refuses.

When billionaire Alex Cullen is accused of murdering his wife, his stepson, and a maid, Milton assigns the case to Kevin. This demands more of Kevin's time, further separating him from Mary Ann, and he begins to fantasize about his co-worker, Christabella. Mary Ann begins seeing visions of the partners' wives becoming demonic, and has a nightmare about a baby playing with her removed ovaries. After a doctor declares her infertile, she begs Kevin to return them to Gainesville, but he refuses. Milton suggests Kevin step down from the trial to tend to Mary Ann, but Kevin says that he fears he will resent her for costing him the case.

Eddie Barzoon, the firm's managing partner, is convinced that Kevin is competing for his job after discovering Kevin's name on the firm's charter and threatens to inform the United States Attorney's office of the firm's activities. Kevin tells Milton about Eddie's threats, but Milton seems to dismiss them; during the conversation, Eddie is beaten to death in Central Park by vagrants with demonic appearances.

While preparing Melissa Black, Alex Cullen's secretary, to testify about the latter's alibi, Kevin realizes she is lying and tells Milton he believes Alex is guilty. Milton offers to back him regardless and Kevin proceeds, winning an acquittal with Melissa's perjured testimony. Afterwards, Kevin finds Mary Ann covered with a blanket in a nearby church. She claims Milton raped her that day, but Kevin insists Milton was with him in court. Mary Ann drops her blanket, revealing her body covered with cuts and scratches. Assuming she injured herself, Kevin commits her to a mental institution. U.S. Justice Department agent Mitch Weaver warns Kevin that Milton is corrupt and reveals that Gettys has been arrested for killing a little girl. Moments later, Weaver is struck by a car and killed.

Alice, Kevin, and Pam Garrety, his case manager, visit Mary Ann at the institution. After seeing Pam as a demon, Mary Ann hits her, barricades the room, and commits suicide. Alice reveals that Milton is Kevin's father, whom she met in New York decades earlier. Kevin leaves the hospital to confront Milton, who admits to raping Mary Ann. Kevin shoots Milton, but the bullets do not harm him. Milton reveals himself as Satan; Kevin blames him for everything that happened, but Milton counters that he merely "set the stage", and that Kevin chose to neglect Mary Ann and defend the guilty. Kevin realizes he always wanted to win, no matter the cost. Christabella appears, and Milton announces that he wants Kevin and Christabella - Kevin's half-sister - to conceive the Antichrist. Kevin initially appears to acquiesce, but then abruptly shoots himself in the head. Milton's Satanic rage burns Christabella alive, initially revealing his demonic form before turning into an angel who resembles Kevin.

Suddenly, Kevin finds himself back at the recess of the Gettys trial. He announces that he cannot represent his client despite the threat of disbarment. Kevin's reporter friend Larry offers him a high-profile interview, promising to make him famous. Encouraged by Mary Ann, Kevin agrees. After they leave, Larry transforms into Milton, who declares, "Vanity--definitely my favorite sin."

Cast

Themes and interpretations

The Devil character's name is a direct homage to John Milton, who wrote Paradise Lost, quoted by Lomax with the line "Better to reign in Hell, than serve in Heav'n". Despite this, the thrust of Milton's epic was to rebuke the devil. As a rebel against God, complaining of being perpetually "underestimated", the Milton character, like Paradise Losts Satan, is "Heav'n running from Heav'n" with a "sense of injur'd merit".

Professor Eric C. Brown judges the climax, in which Milton attempts to persuade Lomax to have sex with his half-sister to conceive the Antichrist, to be the most "Miltonic", as the sculptures become animated in carnal activities evoking Paradise Losts "Downfall of the Rebel Angels". The tirade Milton gives in this sequence is at times also reminiscent of Satan's lines in Paradise Lost Books I and II. In U.S. literary education, Milton's temptation of Lomax in the climax, in which he rationalizes rebellion against God for a "Look, but don't touch" model, has been compared to Satan urging Eve to eat forbidden fruit in Paradise Lost, Book IX, lines 720–730:

In his DVD commentary, Taylor Hackford did not name Paradise Lost as an inspiration, instead citing the legend of Faust. An underlying concept of the story is a "Faustian bargain", offered to a character with free will. Philosopher Peter van Inwagen writes Milton referring to free will as a "bitch", when Lomax contemplates selling his soul, moves away from a legalistic definition of "free will" as "uncoerced", into the philosophical realm of its definition.

As with Goethe's Faust, the Devil commonly depicted in cinema is associated with lust and temptation.  Milton shows Lomax many seductive women, in order to induce his "fall". Sex or rape is usually also the means by which Satan creates the Antichrist, as in Roman Polanski's 1968 film Rosemary's Baby. In The Devil's Advocate, someone other than Satan will have sex to conceive the Antichrist, though Milton nevertheless brutally rapes Mary Ann. Incest becomes a way of creating the Antichrist, since the offspring of Satan's son and daughter will inherit much of Satan's genetic makeup.

Dante Alighieri's Inferno raised "visual potential" that informed the film. Dantean scholar Amilcare A. Iannucci argues the plot follows the Divine Comedy model in beginning with selva oscura, in Lomax losing his conscience defending a guilty man, and then entering and exploring deeper circles of Hell. Iannucci compares the office building structure to the circles, listing fireplaces where flames are always present; demonic visual phenomena; and water outside Milton's office, analogized to Dante's Satan's icy home, albeit situated at the top of Hell as opposed to the bottom. Free will is also a major theme in the Divine Comedy, with the film's musings on the concept being similar to Dante's Purgatorio, 16.82–83 ("if the present world has gone astray, in you is the cause, in you it's to be sought").

Other religious references are present. In describing New York City as Babylon, Alice Lomax invokes Revelation 18:

Milton tempting Lomax is possibly also inspired by the Biblical Temptation of Christ. Aside from Milton, other character names have been commented on: Author Kelly J. Wyman matches Mary Ann, the virginal figure who falls victim to Milton, to the Virgin Mary, and adds the literal translation of Christabella is "Beautiful Christ", and that the title refers to the Catholic Church's Devil's advocates and lawyers as advocates; Eric C. Brown finds Barzoon's name and character to be reminiscent of the demon prince Beelzebub. Scholars Miguel A. De La Torre and Albert Hernández observe the vision of Satan as CEO, wearing expensive clothing and engaging in business, had appeared in popular culture before, including the 1942 novel The Screwtape Letters.

Production

Development

Andrew Neiderman wrote The Devil's Advocate as a novel, and it was published in 1990 by Simon and Schuster. Believing his story could be adapted into a film, Neiderman approached Warner Bros. and claimed to have led his successful sale with the synopsis "It's about a law firm in New York that represents only guilty people, and never loses".

Various screenplay adaptations of The Devil's Advocate had been pitched to U.S. cinema studios, with Joel Schumacher planned to direct it with Brad Pitt as the young lawyer. Schumacher planned a sequence in which Pitt would descend into the New York subway system, which would be modeled on the circles of hell in Dante's Divine Comedy. With no actor to play Satan, this project collapsed.

The O.J. Simpson murder trial and its controversial outcome gave new impetus to relaunching the project, with a $60 million budget. Warner hired Taylor Hackford to direct the new attempt. The director embraced the legal drama aspect, theorizing, "The courtroom has become the gladiator arena of the late twentieth century. Following the progress of a sensational trial is a spectator sport".

Tony Gilroy led much of the rewrite, with supervision by Hackford, who envisioned it as "a modern-day morality play" and "Faustian tale". As the screenplay developed, free will became a theme, in which Milton does not actually cause events. Hackford wanted suggestions that Milton does not kill Barzoon, as he defied his muggers, or United States Attorney Weaver, who arrogantly did not watch for vehicles before stepping onto the road.

The screenwriters added the plot element that Lomax was Milton's son, and that Milton could produce the Antichrist, neither of which are in the novel. Hackford cited the films Rosemary's Baby and The Omen as influences, and both had explored the Antichrist mythology. Another change from the novel was converting the book's lesbian client to the male molester Lloyd Gettys, avoiding undertones of homophobia. In an early version of the screenplay, the "Better to reign in Hell than serve in Heaven" quotation is given to Milton rather than Lomax.

Casting
Al Pacino had previously been offered the Devil role in attempts at adapting Neiderman's novel, but before final rewrites, rejected it on three occasions, for the clichéd nature of the character. Pacino suggested Robert Redford and Sean Connery for the role. Keanu Reeves chose to star in Devil's Advocate over Speed 2, despite a promised $11 million for the sequel to his 1994 hit Speed; according to Reeves' staff, the actor was averse to performing in two consecutive action films after Chain Reaction (1996). On Devil's Advocate, Reeves agreed to a pay cut worth millions of dollars so that the producers could meet Pacino's salary demands. To prepare for the role, Pacino watched the 1941 film The Devil and Daniel Webster and observed tips from Walter Huston as Mr. Scratch. He also read Dante's Inferno and Paradise Lost.

Connie Nielsen, a Danish actress, was selected by Hackford for Christabella, who speaks several languages, with Hackford saying Nielsen already spoke multiple languages. Craig T. Nelson, known for his television work, was cast against type in a villainous role.

Filming

Principal photography began in New York in 1996, but struggled by November. Delays were caused by the dismissals of the original cinematographer and assistant directors, while an anonymous source claimed Pacino found Hackford to be conceited and loud. An executive alleged Pacino was typically late to work, though producer Arnold Kopelson said this was not the case. Hackford later said Pacino was professional, even though his status meant he did not need to be.

Production designer Bruno Rubeo was tasked to create Milton's apartment, aiming for a "very loose and very sexy" appearance, "so you can't really tell where it goes". Hackford said on this set, he encouraged Reeves and Pacino to "feel the room" and develop some improvisation. Pacino came up with the idea of dancing to "It Happened in Monterey" by Frank Sinatra, and Hackford immediately adopted the idea.

When Lomax leaves to meet Milton, he walks through 57th Street in New York, which is abnormally devoid of people or vehicles. It was shot at the actual 57th Street, with the filmmakers having it emptied at 7:30 a.m. on a Sunday. The offices were shot at the Continental Club in Manhattan, and the Continental Plaza, though the water outside Milton's office was added later by computer effects. In constructing the firm sets, Hackford and Rubeo consulted one architect from Japan and one from Italy to craft an "ultra-modern" look, to display Milton's taste. Donald Trump's penthouse in Trump Tower, Fifth Avenue was lent to the production for Alexander Cullen's residence.

A number of churches and courts hosted production. The interior of New York City's Church of the Heavenly Rest was used for the scene where Theron's character says Milton raped her. The outside of Central Presbyterian Church was photographed for Barzoon's funeral, while Pacino was inside the Manhattan Church of the Most Holy Redeemer for the holy water sequence. For court scenes, New Jersey's Bergen County Court House was employed for production, as were historic courthouses in New York.

After the completion of the New York shoot in March 1997, production moved to Florida in July 1997. In Jacksonville, Florida, the interior of the Mrs. Howard's business in Riverside and Avondale was used for New York scenes. Its co-owner Jim Howard remodeled the store and appeared as an extra. The Gainesville church scenes were shot at an actual Gainesville church, after Hackford persuaded the pastor and his members to participate, and that his story was about combating Satan.

Post-production
At the end of the film, John Milton morphs into Lucifer as a fallen angel. The crew created the effect by combining life masks depicting Reeves, Pacino in 1997 and Pacino as he appeared in the 1972 film The Godfather. The Godfather make-up artist Dick Smith supplied the life mask he made in the 1970s to Devil's Advocate artist Rick Baker, Smith's former protégé. Additionally, Baker created images for demonic faces seen on real actresses and actors, with hands also appearing to move underneath Tamara Tunie's skin, a digital creation with the contributions of Richard Greenberg and Stephanie Powell.

Shots of ballerinas moving in water were used as a basis for Milton's animated sculpture. Special effects producer Edward L. Williams said he filmed the people for the statue effect, and that they were naked and placed in a tank next to a blue screen. It took three months to film the people and then add the computer effects, at a cost of $2 million, or 40% of the overall budget for special effects.

James Newton Howard, a past collaborator with Hackford, was tasked to write the score. Hackford dubbed over Pacino's performance of "It Happened in Monterey" with Sinatra's voice.  "Paint It Black" by The Rolling Stones is also used for the film's conclusion.

Release
During early stages of photography, Warner aspired to a release in August 1997. The film eventually had its release on October 17, 1997, on the same day as another horror film, I Know What You Did Last Summer. To promote the release, Warner's website included the warning on hell's gate from Dante's Inferno Canto III ("Abandon every hope, ye who enter here"), with credits presented as circles of hell. The television advertising and poster were upfront as to Milton being Satan, though this is not explicitly revealed in the film itself until its later acts.

Around 475,000 copies of the VHS and DVD were produced by February 1998, but their release into the home video market was delayed pending the Hart v. Warner Bros., Inc. lawsuit. The film afterwards went into regular airings on TNT and TBS. A Blu-ray edition was released in Region A in 2012, as an "Unrated Director's Cut" in which the art in the climax previously subject to the lawsuit is digitally redone.

Reception

Box office
On its opening weekend in October 1997, The Devil's Advocate earned $12.2 million, finishing second in the U.S. box office to I Know What You Did Last Summer, which made $16.1 million. The Devil's Advocate was largely competing against thriller films aimed at youth in the Halloween season. By December 6, 1997, it grossed $56.1 million. It ended its run on February 12, 1998, with a gross of $61 million in North America and $92 million elsewhere.

Critical response

Review aggregation website Rotten Tomatoes assigned the film an approval rating of 64% based on 58 reviews, with an average rating of 6.2/10. The site's critics consensus states: "Though it is ultimately somewhat undone by its own lofty ambitions, The Devil's Advocate is a mostly effective blend of supernatural thrills and character exploration." Metacritic gives the film a weighted average score of 60 out of 100, based on 19 critics, indicating "mixed or average reviews". Audiences polled by CinemaScore gave the film an average grade of "B" on an A+ to F scale.

Roger Ebert wrote, "The movie never fully engaged me; my mind raced ahead of the plot, and the John Grisham stuff clashed with the Exorcist stuff". In The New York Times, Janet Maslin complimented the "gratifyingly light touch" of using John Milton's name, and special effects with "gimmicks well tethered to reality". David Denby wrote in New York that Devil's Advocate was "preposterously entertaining" and predicted it would get viewers debating. Entertainment Weekly gave it a B, with Owen Gleiberman declaring it "at once silly, overwrought, and almost embarrassingly entertaining", and crediting Pacino for his performance. Gleiberman later declared that Pacino had won the magazine's yearly award for Best Overacting. Varietys Todd McCarthy declared it "fairly entertaining", displaying "a nearly operatic sense of absurdity and excess". Dave Kehr of New York Daily News also preferred Pacino over Reeves, assessing The Devil's Advocate as Faust moved to Manhattan, though disappointed that a "witty undercurrent becomes an exaggerated moralism". Critic James Berardinelli wrote that it "is a highly enjoyable motion picture that's part character study, part supernatural thriller, and part morality play".

In The New York Times Magazine, Michiko Kakutani objected to trivializing Satan, reducing Paradise Lost vision of the War in Heaven to "an extended lawyer joke". The Christian Science Monitors David Sterritt found it an unsurprising cinematic re-imagining of Faust with Satan a lawyer, but he recognized its message of "the need for personal responsibility", albeit with "more lascivious sex and shocking violence than a traditional 'Faust' rendition".

The film won the Saturn Award for Best Horror Film. Pacino was also nominated for the MTV Movie Award for Best Villain.

In 2014, Yahoo! named The Devil's Advocate as "Pacino's Most Underrated Film", claiming "Pacino's hammy devil never got his due" but "there's something to be said for an actor who can pull off this level of theatrics". In his 2015 Movie Guide, Leonard Maltin gave it three stars, finding Reeves credible and Pacino "delicious". Scott Mendelson wrote in Forbes in 2015 that "I love this trashy, vulgar, unapologetically puritan melodrama more than I care to admit". In 2016, The Huffington Post reported on an online debate over the possible symbolism in the costume design, as Lomax appears in suits that are light in the beginning, becoming increasingly darker as his morality slips away. The counterpoint is that this merely reflects his increasing social status.

Legacy

Lawsuit

The film was the subject of legal action in Hart v. Warner Bros., Inc. in 1997. The claim was that the sculpture featuring human forms in John Milton's apartment closely resembled the Ex nihilo sculpture by Frederick Hart on the facade of the Episcopal National Cathedral in Washington, D.C., and that a scene involving the sculpture infringed Hart's rights under copyright law in the United States. Hart and the National Cathedral jointly initiated the action, with an argument similar to architect Lebbeus Woods's successful lawsuit over imagery in the film 12 Monkeys. Defenses available to Warner were that the effect was designed without knowledge of Ex nihilo, or fair use.

After a federal judge ruled that the film's video release would be delayed until the case went to trial unless a settlement was reached, Warner Bros. agreed to edit the scene for future releases and to attach stickers to unedited videotapes to indicate there was no relation between the art in the film and Hart's work. The settlement in February 1998 meant 475,000 copies of the VHS and DVD could go into rental stores and businesses.

Adaptations
In 2014, Andrew Neiderman wrote a prequel novel, Judgment Day, about John Milton arriving in New York City and obtaining control of a major law firm. Neiderman brought the book to Warner Bros. for a television series adaptation. John Wells and Arnold Kopelson unsuccessfully attempted to adapt Devil's Advocate into a series in 2014. Produced by Warner Bros. Television, Wells and Kopelson took the project to NBC for a television pilot written by Matt Venne.

A musical play based on The Devil's Advocate is in development.  Julian Woolford also launched a stage adaptation Advocaat van de Duivel in the Netherlands, in 2015.

References

Bibliography

External links

 Official Devil's Advocate site at Warner Bros
 
 
 
 
 

1997 films
1990s legal films
1990s thriller films
1990s supernatural horror films
1997 drama films
1997 horror films
American legal films
American thriller films
American supernatural horror films
American drama films
American courtroom films
Demons in film
1990s English-language films
Films about lawyers
Films based on American horror novels
Films directed by Taylor Hackford
Films produced by Arnold Kopelson
Films scored by James Newton Howard
Films with screenplays by Tony Gilroy
Films set in Florida
Films set in New York City
Films shot in Florida
Films shot in New Jersey
Films shot in New York City
American horror drama films
Legal thriller films
Legal horror films
Regency Enterprises films
Films about Satanism
Supernatural drama films
The Devil in film
Time loop films
Warner Bros. films
Works subject to a lawsuit
Films produced by Arnon Milchan
1990s American films